= EMBARC =

EMBARC (Electronic Mail Broadcast to A Roaming Computer) was a business enterprise of the Motorola company that provided wireless broadcast of e-mail and news to mobile subscribers. It was established in 1990 after Motorola purchased Contemporary Communications, a national carrier for pagers in the 900 MHz band. Unfortunately, alphanumeric pagers did not show rapid growth in the market, forming less than 5% of all pagers by 1991.

The EMBARC service could feed data at 1,200 bps from 3.5 kW ground transmitters. It could send messages up to 1,500 characters long to portable computers that were equipped to receive the messages. It was useful for sending a simultaneous message or memo to up to 500 mobile users. The most likely users of this service were thought to be sales people operating in the field, receivers of service requests, and the transportation industry. The deliveries were charged based on time until reception, with the charge being more cost effective for larger numbers of clients.

In 1996, Motorola attempted to use EMBARC to penetrate a different market: broadcasting current sports scores. However, the EMBARC enterprise failed in April, 1996 and Motorola sold their national paging license. They decided instead to focus on hardware manufacturing.
